The 1939 Jacksonville State Eagle Owls football team represented Jacksonville State Teachers College (now known as Jacksonville State University) as a member of the Alabama Intercollegiate Conference (AIC) during the 1939 college football season. Led by second-year head coach Chester Dillon, the Eagle Owls compiled an overall record of 0–8–2 with a mark of 0–3–1 in conference play.

Schedule

References

Jacksonville State
Jacksonville State Gamecocks football seasons
College football winless seasons
Jacksonville State Eagle Owls football